Ricardo Watty Urquidi (July 16, 1938 – November 1, 2011) was a Mexican-American Roman Catholic bishop of the Diocese of Tepic in Nayarit, Mexico.

Born in San Diego, California, he was ordained to the priesthood in 1968. In 1980 he was named bishop. He died in Tepic on November 1, 2011, aged 73, from pancreatic cancer.

Urquidi was assigned to lead the Mexican section of the Legion of Christ during the Legion's reform process in the late 2000s and early 2010s.

Notes

External links

1938 births
2011 deaths
21st-century Roman Catholic bishops in Mexico
People from San Diego
20th-century Roman Catholic bishops in Mexico
Deaths from pancreatic cancer
Deaths from cancer in Mexico
Roman Catholic bishops of Tepic
Catholics from California
20th-century American Roman Catholic priests
21st-century American Roman Catholic priests